Southern Idaho is a generic geographical term roughly analogous with the areas of the U.S. state of Idaho located in the Mountain Time Zone. It particularly refers to the combined areas of the Boise metropolitan area, the Magic Valley and Eastern Idaho.

Major cities in southern Idaho include Boise, Caldwell, Nampa, Meridian, Pocatello, Idaho Falls and Twin Falls.

Notable people
 Annetta R. Chipp (1866-1961), president, South Idaho Woman's Christian Temperance Union
 Ella D. Crawford (1852-1932), president, South Idaho Woman's Christian Temperance Union

See also
Southern Idaho ground squirrel
Time in Idaho

References

Regions of Idaho